Lomatium utriculatum is a species of flowering plant in the carrot family known by the common name common lomatium or spring gold. It is native to western North America from British Columbia to California, where it grows in many types of habitat including chaparral, and in the Sierra Nevada.

Description
Each leaf is generally divided and subdivided into many small linear lobes. Leaves higher on the stem have prominent sheaths.

Range and Habitat
Lomatium utriculatum is native to western North America from British Columbia to California, where it grows in many types of habitat including chaparral, and in the Sierra Nevada. In Washington, Oregon, and British Columbia it is found most often west of the Cascade Mountain crest, unlike most Lomatium species, which grow in dry areas east of the Cascades.

Uses
This plant was used as a food and medicinal remedy by many Native American groups, some of whom ate the fresh leaves raw.

References

External links

Calflora Database: Lomatium utriculatum (Bladder parsnip, hog fennel)
Jepson Manual eFlora (TJM2) treatment of Lomatium utriculatum
USDA Plants Profile for Lomatium utriculatum (common lomatium)
UC Photos gallery — Lomatium utriculatum

utriculatum
Flora of the West Coast of the United States
Flora of British Columbia
Flora of California
Flora of the Cascade Range
Flora of the Sierra Nevada (United States)
Natural history of the California chaparral and woodlands
Natural history of the California Coast Ranges
Natural history of the Peninsular Ranges
Natural history of the Transverse Ranges
Taxa named by John Merle Coulter
Flora without expected TNC conservation status